Zeta Leporis, Latinized from ζ Leporis, is a star approximately  away in the southern constellation of Lepus. It has an apparent visual magnitude of 3.5, which is bright enough to be seen with the naked eye. In 2001, an asteroid belt was confirmed to orbit the star.

Stellar components
Zeta Leporis has a stellar classification of A2 IV-V(n), suggesting that it is in a transitional stage between an A-type main-sequence star and a subgiant. The (n) suffix indicates that the absorption lines in the star's spectrum appear nebulous because it is spinning rapidly, causing the lines to broaden because of the Doppler effect. The projected rotational velocity is 245 km/s, giving a lower limit on the star's actual equatorial azimuthal velocity.

The star has about 1.46 times the mass of the Sun, along with 1.5 times the radius, and 14 times the luminosity. The abundance of elements other than hydrogen and helium, what astronomers term the star's metallicity, is only 17% of the abundance in the Sun. The star appears to be very young, probably around 231 million years in age, but the margin of error spans 50–347 million years old.

Asteroid belt

In 1983, based on radiation in the infrared portion of the electromagnetic spectrum, the InfraRed Astronomical Satellite was used to identify dust orbiting this star. This debris disk is constrained to a diameter of 12.2 AU.

By 2001, the Long Wavelength Spectrometer at the Keck Observatory on Mauna Kea, Hawaii, was used more accurately to constrain the radius of the dust. It was found to lie within a 5.4 AU radius. The temperature of the dust was estimated as about 340 K. Based on heating from the star, this could place the grains as close as 2.5 AU from Zeta Leporis.

It is now believed that the dust is coming from a massive asteroid belt in orbit around Zeta Leporis, making it the first extra-solar asteroid belt to be discovered. For comparison, this is more than half the total mass of the Moon. Astronomers Christine Chen and professor Michael Jura found that the dust contained within this belt should have fallen into the star within 20,000 years, a time period much shorter than Zeta Leporis's estimated age, suggesting that some mechanism must be replenishing the belt. The belt's age is estimated to be  years.

Solar encounter
Bobylev's calculations from 2010 suggest that this star passed as close as 1.28 parsecs (4.17 light-years) from the Sun about 861,000 years ago. García-Sánchez 2001 suggested that the star passed 1.64 parsecs (5.34 light-years) from the Sun about 1 million years ago. It was the brightest star in the night sky over 1 million years ago, peaking with an apparent magnitude of -2.05.

See also
 Delta Trianguli
 HD 69830
 Vega

References

Further reading

External links
 
 UCLA astronomers identify evidence of asteroid belt around nearby star: Findings indicate potential for planet or asteroid formation, 2001.
 
 Wikisky image of Zeta Leporis

Leporis, Zeta
Circumstellar disks
Leporis, 14
038678
027288
Lepus (constellation)
A-type main-sequence stars
1998
Durchmusterung objects
Gliese and GJ objects